Revelation 12 is the twelfth chapter of the Book of Revelation or the Apocalypse of John in the New Testament of the Christian Bible. The book is traditionally attributed to John the Apostle, but the precise identity of the author remains a point of academic debate. This chapter contains the accounts about the woman, the dragon, and the child, followed by the war between Michael and the dragon, then the appearance of the monster from the sea. William Robertson Nicoll, a Scottish Free Church minister, suggests that in this chapter the writer has created a Christianised version of a Jewish source which "described the birth of the Messiah in terms borrowed from ... cosmological myths [such as] that of the conflict between the sun-god and the dragon of darkness and the deep".

Text
The original text was written in Koine Greek. This chapter is divided into 17 verses. The Vulgate version has 18 verses.

Textual witnesses
Some early manuscripts containing the text of this chapter are among others:
Papyrus 115 (ca. AD 275; extant verses 1-5, 8-10, 12-17)
Papyrus 47 (3rd century)
Codex Sinaiticus (330-360)
Codex Alexandrinus (400-440)
Codex Ephraemi Rescriptus (ca. 450; complete)

Old Testament references
 Revelation 12:5: Psalm

New Testament references
 Revelation 12:5: Revelation ; 19:15.

The Woman, the Dragon and the Child (12:1–6)

Verse 1

Now a great sign appeared in heaven: a woman clothed with the sun, with the moon under her feet, and on her head a garland of twelve stars.
The King James Version refers to "a great wonder"  and the Revised Standard Version refers to "a great portent". Anglican biblical commentator William Boyd Carpenter writes that "the word sign is preferable to wonder, both in this verse and in Revelation 12:3. It is a sign which is seen: not a mere wonder, but something which has a meaning; it is not 'a surprise ending with itself', but a signal to arrest attention, and possessing significance; there is 'an idea concealed behind it'."

Verse 3
 And another sign appeared in heaven: behold, a great, fiery red dragon having seven heads and ten horns, and seven diadems on his heads.
The word rendered "dragon" - ,  - occurs 9 times (and 4 more in derivative forms) in the New Testament, only in the Book of Revelation, where it is uniformly rendered as here: "dragon". The word for diadem (Greek: διάδημα) occurs only three times in the New Testament, always in the Book of Revelation.

Verse 5
 And she brought forth a man child, who was to rule all nations with a rod of iron: and her child was caught up unto God, and to his throne.

Michael and the Dragon (12:7–12)

Verse 7
 And war broke out in heaven: Michael and his angels fought with the dragon, and the dragon and his angels fought.
Michael (Mikha'el in David H. Stern's translation of the Bible into English) appears in the Book of Daniel as "the special patron or guardian angel of the people of Israel".

Verse 8
and they were not strong enough, and there was no longer a place found for them in heaven.

Verse 9
And the great dragon was cast out, that old serpent called the Devil, and Satan, which deceiveth the whole world: he was cast out into the earth, and his angels were cast out with him.
"Old serpent": This is the only place in canonical Scripture where without doubt it is revealed that the 'Tempter in Eden' was 'the Devil' (cf.  for a non-canonical Scripture allusion).

Verse 11
 And they overcame him by the blood of the Lamb, and by the word of their testimony, and they loved not their lives unto the death.
"Overcame him by the blood of the Lamb" or "conquered him on account of the blood of the Lamb", implying that the power of the accuser or the devil was removed when 'the Lamb of God' had taken away the sin of the world, and when the redeemed people have the boldness to enter into the holiest by the blood of Jesus.

The Dragon and the Woman (12:13–17)

Verse 14
 And to the woman were given two wings of a great eagle, that she might fly into the wilderness, into her place, where she is nourished for a time, and times, and half a time, from the face of the serpent.
"Two wings of a great eagle": Bauckham sees the "eagle's wings" and the "wilderness" in this verse as "exodus motifs".

Verse 16
 And the earth helped the woman, and the earth opened her mouth, and swallowed up the flood which the dragon cast out of his mouth.

See also
 War in Heaven
 Jesus Christ
 John's vision of the Son of Man
 Names and titles of Jesus in the New Testament
 Seven trumpets
 Woman of the Apocalypse
 Related Bible parts: Revelation 5, Revelation 6, Revelation 7, Revelation 8, Revelation 9, Revelation 11, Revelation 13

Notes

References

Bibliography

External links
 King James Bible - Wikisource
English Translation with Parallel Latin Vulgate 
Online Bible at GospelHall.org (ESV, KJV, Darby, American Standard Version, Bible in Basic English)
Multiple bible versions at Bible Gateway (NKJV, NIV, NRSV, etc.)

12
 Nativity of Jesus in the New Testament
War in Heaven